The Royal Game (also known as Chess Story; in the original German Schachnovelle, "Chess Novella") is a novella by the Austrian author Stefan Zweig written in 1941, the year before the author's death by suicide. In some editions, the title is used for a collection that also includes "Amok", "Burning Secret", "Fear", and "Letter From an Unknown Woman".

Plot summary
An anonymous narrator opens the story by describing the boarding of a passenger liner traveling from New York to Buenos Aires. One of the passengers is world chess champion Mirko Czentovic. Czentovic is an idiot savant and prodigy with no obvious qualities apart from his talent for chess. The narrator plays chess with his wife, hoping to draw Czentovic's attention and engage him in a game. The narrator draws the attention of McConnor, a businessman, who offers to pay Czentovic's fee.

They are about to lose a second game when they are interrupted by Dr B., who prevents them from blundering and guides the party to a draw.

Dr B. tells his story to the narrator. He was a lawyer who managed the assets of the Austrian nobility and church. He was arrested by the Gestapo, who hoped to extract information from Dr B. in order to steal the assets. The Gestapo kept Dr B. imprisoned in a hotel, in total isolation, but Dr B. maintained his sanity by stealing a book of past masters' chess games, which he learned completely. After absorbing every single move in the book, he began to play against himself, developing the ability to separate his psyche into two personas. This psychological conflict ultimately caused him to suffer a breakdown, after which he awakened in a hospital. A sympathetic physician attested his insanity to keep him from being imprisoned again by the Nazis, and he was freed.

The passengers persuade Dr B. to play alone against Czentovic. Dr B. agrees, but warns that he must not be allowed to play a second game. In a stunning demonstration of his imaginative and combinational powers, Dr B. beats the world champion. Czentovic suggests another game to restore his honour, and Dr B. immediately agrees. But this time, having sensed that Dr B. played quite fast and hardly took time to think, Czentovic tries to irritate his opponent by taking several minutes to make each move, thereby putting psychological pressure on Dr B., who gets more and more impatient as the game proceeds. His greatest power turns out to be his greatest weakness: he devolves into rehearsing imagined matches against himself repeatedly and manically. Czentovic's slow deliberation drives Dr B. to distraction and ultimately to insanity, culminating in an incorrect statement about a check by his bishop. The narrator urges Dr B. to stop playing, awakening Dr B. from his frenzy.  Dr B. resigns the game, apologizes for his outbursts, and withdraws from the board.  As Dr B. leaves, Czentovic comments that he had been mounting a reasonable attack.

Historical background

Following the occupation and annexation of Austria by Nazi Germany, the country's monarchists (i.e. supporters of Otto von Habsburg as the rightful Emperor-Archduke and the rule of the House of Habsburg), conservatives as well as supporters of Engelbert Dollfuss' Austrofascist regime, were severely persecuted by the Nazis, as they were seen as opponents of the Nazi regime. Thousands of monarchists were executed or sent to concentration camps, and the pretender to the throne, Otto von Habsburg, fled to the United States, being sentenced to death in absentia by the Nazis.

Alekhine vs. Bogoljubow, Pistyan 1922

Throughout the story, chess games are not described in detail.  Instead, the narrative focuses on the general nature of chess and the psychological aspects of gameplay.  One exception occurs during the second consultation game against Czentovic, which is given some detail.  Czentovic plays as White while McConnor, the narrator and others jointly decide each move for Black.  Following 37... c2 and White's response, the consultation party are about to play 38... c1=Q?, promoting their pawn to a queen, but they are stopped at the last moment by Dr B., who enters the story.

Dr B. explains that the newly promoted black queen will be captured immediately by a white bishop, which will then be captured by a black knight, after which White will advance his own passed pawn to d7, attacking a black rook.  According to Dr B., even if Black responds by checking White with their knight, White will still win in "nine or ten" moves.  Dr B. says that the position—and the above threatened combination—are "almost the same" as Alekhine vs. Bogoljubow, Pistyan, 1922.  Dr B. instead advises 38... Kh7, which Black plays.  In the story, play continues 39. h4 Rc4 40. e5 Nxe5, and Dr B. advises Black to "force an exchange".  "Some seven moves later", Czentovic offers a draw.

Although the story's game—and its position at the critical moment—are not described in full, the given details (and potential variation) are identical with the real game mentioned by Dr B., played between Alekhine and Bogoljubow, following 38. d6.  The fictional game, also like the real one, ended as a draw (roughly) seven moves after 40... Nxe5 was played.  The real game concluded with each side capturing the other's passed pawns (which each threatened immediate promotion); in the final position the material was equal (White had a bishop for Black's knight), although Black retained a passed pawn at a6.

Algebraic notation

Both in its original German text and also in later translations, The Royal Game makes use of algebraic notation to describe chess moves.  At the time of its publication (and of its fictional setting) in the early 1940s, algebraic notation was widespread in German-speaking chess culture, but had not been widely accepted in the Anglosphere, which still made use of descriptive notation.  During the 1970s and 1980s, algebraic notation was gradually accepted in the English-speaking world and standardized by FIDE as the proper method for recording chess games.  The use of algebraic notation in English translations of The Royal Game is therefore not an anachronism.

In the story, algebraic notation itself also functions as a plot device.  When Dr B. suffers a nervous breakdown and recovers in a hospital, a doctor asks whether he is a mathematician or a chemist.  During Dr B.'s delirium, he would shout formulaic expressions, e.g. "c3, c4", terminology unfamiliar to the medical staff.

Adaptations
The Royal Game was the inspiration for the 1960 Gerd Oswald film Brainwashed, originally titled Die Schachnovelle, as well as for two Czechoslovakian films: the 1980  Královská hra (The Royal Game) and Šach mat (Checkmate), made for television in 1964.

An opera based on the novel premiered at the Kiel Opera House on 18 May 2013. The music was by Cristóbal Halffter, and the libretto by Wolfgang Haendeler.

The story was the basis of the production 64 Squares from the Rhum and Clay Theatre Company presented at the Edinburgh Festival Fringe in August 2015. In this production the character "B" is played by three actors, both separately and together, assisted by a percussionist.

A German/Austrian production entitled Schachnovelle (English title The Royal Game), released in August 2021, is an adaptation of the Stefan Zweig story as well as the film, Brainwashed.

References

External links
Elke Rehder: Remarks on The Royal Game by Stefan Zweig 1942–1944 An article from 2015 with pictures on the history of Schachnovelle.
PushkinPress.com English editions of Stefan Zweig's novellas
Legamus.eu Audiobook version of the novella (in German)

1942 novels
Austrian novels
Novellas by Stefan Zweig
German novellas
Austrian novellas
Novels about chess
Austrian novels adapted into films
20th-century Austrian novels
Novels adapted into operas
Austrian novels adapted into plays